General elections were held in Colombia on 19 April 1970 to elect the President, the Senate and the Chamber of Representatives. It was the first time all three institutions had been elected on the same day, and was also the last election under the National Front agreement, which had restricted electoral participation to the Conservative Party and the Liberal Party, with each party allocated 50% of the seats in both houses, whilst the Presidency alternated between the two parties. As a result, the main contest in parliamentary elections was between factions within each party, whilst only Conservative candidates ran for the presidency. The result was a victory for Misael Pastrana Borrero, who received 40.7% of the vote. However, supporters of Gustavo Rojas Pinilla claimed that the election had been rigged in favour of Pastrana. Rojas had also been supported by the Christian Social Democratic Party. The 19th of April Movement guerrillas traced their origins to this alleged fraud.

Background
The 1970 elections were set to be the last of the National Front, the agreement signed by the leaders of the Conservative and Liberal parties in the aftermath of five years of military dictatorship. In the agreement, formalized by the passage of Legislative Act 1 on 15 September 1959, the two parties pledged to alternate the power of the presidency for the next three elections. From 1958, each alternating presidential election was uncontested by the other party; the previous elections had brought to power Liberal Carlos Lleras Restrepo, while 1970 was set to be the year of the Conservatives.

Misael Pastrana Borrero, a former minister and Ambassador to the United States, launched his candidacy in Medellín in September 1969. A Conservative, he was eventually nominated as the National Front candidate at the national conventions of both the Conservative and Liberal parties. His platform was largely a continuation of his Liberal predecessor's moderate economic and social policies, and he campaigned with the slogan "I am not a man. I am a program." President Lleras actively campaigned on his behalf, violating the impartiality of the executive.

Despite Pastrana's nomination by the National Front, dissident Conservatives emerged to challenge his candidacy. Belisario Betancur and Evaristo Sourdis Juliao enjoyed the support of their regional constituencies, Antioquia and the Caribbean region.

The National Popular Alliance (ANAPO) was a political movement formed in 1961 by Gustavo Rojas Pinilla, a retired general who had ruled the country as military dictator from 1953 to 1957. ANAPO was a populist grouping of dissident liberals, conservatives, and leftists, united by their common rejection of the National Front coalition. Rojas previously ran as the ANAPO candidate in the 1962 elections against Guillermo León Valencia, but his candidacy was invalidated by the Supreme Court; this sentence had been overturned in 1967 and the ex-dictator again sought to return to the presidency by democratic means.

Results

President

Senate

Chamber of Representatives

References

Parliamentary elections in Colombia
Colombia
1970 in Colombia
Presidential elections in Colombia